The 2013 UTSA Roadrunners football team represented the University of Texas at San Antonio in the 2013 NCAA Division I FBS football season. This was the third season for football at UTSA and their first as members of the Conference USA in the West Division. Larry Coker returned as the team's head coach for a third season. The Roadrunners played their home games at the Alamodome.  A popular battle cry, "We'll go 99," surfaced after the New Mexico game in which UTSA drove the ball 99 yards to score a touchdown and seal the win.

Schedule

Schedule Source:

Roster

Depth chart

Game Summaries

New Mexico

 Source:

#13 Oklahoma State

 Source:

Arizona

 Source:

UTEP

 Source:

Houston

 Source:

References

UTSA
UTSA Roadrunners football seasons
UTSA Roadrunners football